The Gratitude Games is an annual multi-sports "Olympics" competition for workers in the UK's NHS, police, fire service and other emergency services.

The inaugural Gratitude Games will take place in Manchester and Salford from 27 April to 29 May 2022.

References

Recurring sporting events established in 2021
2021 establishments in the United Kingdom
Multi-sport events in the United Kingdom